= Nanjing Land and Visit Program =

Nanjing Land and Visit Program is an enterprise-establishing program promoted by the Nanjing government since 2018. By encouraging star-up industrial park to visit other countries and collect innovating information and resources, the program expects to achieve the goal of star-up industry localization. Land and Visit Program has built 28 innovation centers cooperating with 18 countries as of 2019.
